Christian Tsui Hesse, popularly known as Chris Hesse (born 29 August 1932) is a Ghanaian cinematographer, filmmaker, film administrator, photographer and Presbyterian minister who is known for his cinematography in several award-winning films such as the critically acclaimed Love Brewed in the African Pot (1980) and Heritage Africa (1989). He was the personal photographer of Ghana's first President, Dr Kwame Nkrumah. Chris Hesse helped to document the visual history of the political leadership and development of the country. He also worked for the United Nations, serving as a photographer, documenting the Congo crisis in 1960.

Early life and education 

Chris Tsui Hesse was born on 29 August 1932 at Osu, Accra. He attended the all-boys' Presbyterian boarding middle school, the Salem School and the Odorgonno Secondary School, obtaining the Cambridge Overseas Certificate in 1954. In the same year, he was employed at the Ghana Film Industry Corporation (GFIC). He attended the National Film School in Łódź in Poland and graduated in 1960. He also obtained a post-graduate certificate in Film and TV Arts from the University of Sorbonne in Paris. His other academic credentials include a Bachelor of Divinity (1985) and a PhD (1989) in Film and Arts, both earned from the University of Southern California, California.

Career 
His entire working career spans four decades (1954–1994), spent in the service of the Gold Coast Film Unit, later called the Ghana Industry Corporation. He worked on the British Academy Film Award which later got nominated for Best Film from any Source, The Boy Kumasenu (1952) directed by British director Sean Graham. Hesse rose through the ranks to become the managing director of the Ghana Film Industry Corporation (GFIC) for ten years until his retirement from government service 1994. Chris Hesse has a wealth of experience in film production, including being the head of News Department of the GFIC for ten years (1974–1984) within which he produced several newsreels, magazines, adverts and short documentaries, some of which have won international awards. He won the Golden Camera Award (First Prize in Cinematography in Africa) at the Pan African Film Festival in Ouagadougou, Burkina Faso (FESPACO) in 1985. He was the director of photography for Kwaw Ansah's award-winning films Love Brewed in the African Pot (1980) and Heritage Africa (1989). He was also the director of photography for the filmmaker Ato Yanney Snr.’s His Majesty's Sergeant (1984). He also travelled extensively throughout the world filming conferences at the UN, Commonwealth, OAU, Non-Aligned Movement, visits of Heads of State and various international seminars.

Chris Hesse is known to be the first war cameraman to shoot a film on the Congo Crisis in 1960 for worldwide distribution in the capacity as an Honorary Captain in the Peace Keeping Force in 1960. From pre-colonial to post-independent Ghana (1956–1966), he was the official cinematographer to Kwame Nkrumah (1956–1966) and also to subsequent Heads of State namely: J. A. Ankrah, A. A. Afrifa, K. A. Busia, I. K. Acheampong, Fred Akuffo, Hilla Liman and J. J. Rawlings.

He was ordained into the Christian ministry of the Presbyterian Church of Ghana in 1985 and served in several congregations. He also became the executive director of the Prisons Ministry of Ghana. Chris Hesse has been married to Regina Hesse (a retired Officer of the Bank of Ghana) since 1959 and they have five adult children and grandchildren. His hobbies include lawn tennis, jogging, cycling and yoga. He is fluent in English, French, Ga and Twi.

In 2014, Chris Hesse was honoured for his immense contributions to cinema and the nation at the 3rd NAFTI Film Lectures on the Motion Picture Industry which focused on his work as a cinematographer, film director and documentary photographer. Hesse is one of the individuals who have consistently called for the passage of the film bill which is intended to put in place all the necessary structures and systems for the film industry. Chris Tsui Hesse is a founding member and former President of the Ghana Academy of Film and Television Arts (GAFTA). In 2017, Hesse has been honoured at the National Film and Television Institute Awards night in Accra.

Filmography 
 The Boy Kumasenu (1952)
 Progress in Kodjokrom (1953)
 Mr Mensah Builds a House (1956) 
 Beyond the Volta (1956)
 Plebiscite of Togoland (1957)
 Freedom for Ghana (1957) 
 Operation Congo (1960) 
 Love Brewed in the African Pot (1980)
 His Majesty's Sergeant (1984)
 Heritage Africa (1989)
 Harvest at 17 (1994)
 Cross Road of People, Cross of Trade (1994)

References 

Living people
1932 births
Ghanaian film producers
Ga-Adangbe people
Ghanaian educators
Ghanaian civil servants
Ghanaian clergy
Ghanaian chaplains
Ghanaian people of Danish descent
Ghanaian people of German descent
Ghanaian Presbyterians
Ghanaian Protestants
Hesse family of Ghana
Łódź Film School alumni
People from Accra
University of Paris alumni
University of Southern California alumni
Osu Salem School alumni